Parayarukandi Vettath Gangadharan is an Indian film producer and businessman from Kerala. He has produced 22 Malayalam films under his production company Grihalakshmi Productions. As a producer, he has won two National Film Awards, five Kerala State Film Awards, and six Filmfare Awards South among other awards.

Family
He was born at Calicut in 1943 to Madhavi Sami (1916–1996) and P. V. Sami (1912-1990), a popular businessman and founder of KTC Group of Companies. He is the younger brother of P. V. Chandran, managing editor of Mathrubhumi newspaper, and an industrialist himself. PVG, as he is known, also serves as the director of Mathrubhumi. 

He is married to Mrs. P.V. Sherien, daughter of former Advocate General Sri. Ratna Singh.  Mrs. Shenuga Jaythilak, Mrs. Shegna Vigil and Mrs. Sherga Sandeep are his three daughters.

Filmography (producer)

Awards
National Film Awards

Filmfare Awards South

Kerala State Film Awards

Asianet Film Awards

References

External links
 

P V Gangadharan elected VP of int'l film producers federation.
Yahoo! Movies page for Calmness (2001)
https://archive.today/20130118234303/http://www.chakpak.com/celebrity/p.v.-gangadharan/16280

1943 births
Living people
Malayalam film producers
Businesspeople from Kozhikode
Film producers from Kerala
Producers who won the Best Feature Film National Film Award
Producers who won the Best Film on National Integration National Film Award